Cần Giuộc is a rural district of Long An province in the Mekong Delta region of Vietnam. As of 2003 the district had a population of 161,399. The district covers an area of 211 km². The district capital lies at Cần Giuộc.

Divisions
The district is divided into 16 communes:

Đông Thạnh
Long An
Long Hậu
Long Phụng
Long Thượng
Mỹ Lộc
Phước Hậu
Phước Lại
Phước Lâm
Phước Lý
Phước Vĩnh Đông
Phước Vĩnh Tây
Tân Kim
Tân Tập
Thuận Thành
Trường Bình

References

Districts of Long An province